Monte Pelmo is a mountain of the Dolomites, in the province of Belluno, Northeastern Italy.

The mountain resembles a giant block which stands isolated from other peaks, so can be seen clearly from the neighbouring valleys and from nearby mountains such as Antelao and Monte Civetta.

Monte Pelmo was one of the first major Dolomite peaks to be climbed, by Englishman John Ball, who later became president of the UK's Alpine Club, in 1857. He set out with a chamois hunter from the Boitevalley towards Monte Pelmo. Over the long ledge named after Ball, which the chamois hunters refused to cross, Ball got into the large cirque, through which he climbed over the small Pelmo glacier to below the summit structure.

So there are only a few possibilities for climbing. The best known (and easiest) ascent leads over the south-east flank. The route of the first climbers still offers a rewarding but long and strenuous mountain tour in the second degree of difficulty. Problems can be found with the above-mentioned, exposed ball band. Climbing skills and surefootedness are necessary. The ascent of Monte Pelmo should also be carried out in safe weather and without snow.

On some rocks on its western side people can admire dinosaurs prints (Sign "Orme di Dinosauri"). These are the traces of at least three dinosaurs that are approx. 220 million years old. From the path to the tracks you walk steeply uphill for about half an hour.

This mountain is surnamed "God's armchair" because its shape looks like a huge armchair.

Gallery

See also
 Golden age of alpinism
 Silver age of alpinism

References

Dolomites
Mountains of Veneto
Mountains of the Alps
Alpine three-thousanders